Pallacanestro Trieste 2004 is an Italian professional basketball club based in Trieste. They play in the Lega Basket Serie A (LBA) since the 2018–19 season. The Allianz Dome serves as the club's home arena.

History
A number of Trieste teams had played in the first division Serie A, the most successful of which was Società Ginnastica Triestina (from the 1930s to the 1960s) that won several national championships in the 1930s and 1940s. Three other top division Trieste sides were Lega Nazionale Trieste (1949-1951), San Giusto Trieste (1948-1949) and Polizia Civile Trieste (1949-1950).

Pallacanestro Trieste was established in 1975, it played in the top tier Serie A from 1982 to 1986, 1990 to 1997 and again from 1999 to 2004, with a best result of third in 1994.
That same year, it reached the FIBA Korać Cup final.
The next season saw the team reaching the Italian Cup final.

After the 2003-04 season, the club went bankrupt and was relegated to the lower divisions.

After many years spent between the third and fourth division, in 2010 Eugenio Dalmasson was appointed Head Coach. Finally in 2012, the team reached the promotion to the second division with a win against Chieti in an epic game-5 in front of 6000 people.

On June 16, 2018, Trieste won the 2017–18 Serie A2 season after beating Novipiù Casale Monferrato at game 3 of league's playoffs, and returned in LBA, the highest-tier of the Italian basketball league system after 14 years of absence.

On June 26, 2018, Luigi Scavone, the main owner of the title sponsor Alma Agenzia per il lavoro, became new president of Trieste, while the former president Gianluca Mauro became new CEO of the club.

On May 7, 2019, Gianluca Mauro became again president and CEO of the club looking for new sponsorship.

On November 29, 2019, the insurance company Allianz, became new title sponsor and main sponsor of Pallacanestro Trieste for the following three seasons. This sponsorship lapsed at the end of the 2021-2022 season.

In January, 2023, 90% of the club was acquired by San Francisco-based Cotogna Sports Group with the remaining 10% by Trieste-based Trieste Basket.

Players

Current roster

Depth chart

Honours

Domestic competitions
 Italian League
 Winners (5): 1930, 1932, 1934, 1939–40, 1940–41 (as Gimnastica Triestina)
 3rd place (1): 1993–94
 Italian Cup
 Runners-up (1): 1995
 Serie A2 Basket
 Winners (1): 2017–18
 Serie B1 north east division
 Winners (1): 2011–12

European competitions
 FIBA Korać Cup (defunct)
 Runners-up (1): 1993–94

Other competitions
 FIBA International Christmas Tournament (defunct)
 Runners-up (1): 1993

Notable players

Sponsorship names
In the past, due to sponsorship deals, it has also been known as:

Kit manufacturer
 2017–2018: Macron
 2018–2022: Adidas 
 2022–present: Macron

References

External links 
  

 
1975 establishments in Italy
Basketball teams established in 1975
Basketball teams in Italy
EuroLeague clubs
EuroLeague-winning clubs
Sport in Friuli-Venezia Giulia
Sport in Trieste